This is a list of states in the Holy Roman Empire beginning with the letter N:

References

N